Toby Alex Kodat (born 13 January 2003) is an American professional tennis player. Kodat and fellow American Damm are the youngest men's doubles team to win a US Open match in the Open Era.

Kodat has a career high ATP singles ranking of 598 achieved on 29 November 2021. He has a career high junior ranking of 4, achieved on January 11, 2021. Kodat is the half-brother of former tennis player Nicole Vaidišová.

Career

2019: Grand Slam debut and win, Junior Grand Slam Final

In the junior tour, Kodat had reached the finals of the 2019 French Open where he ultimately lost in the final to Holger Rune. In August 2019, Kodat and his partner Martin Damm won the USTA Boys 18s National Championships doubles title, earning the pair a wild-card entry into the doubles main draw of the 2019 US Open. Kodat and fellow American Damm became the youngest men's doubles team to win a US Open match in the Open Era.

2020: First ITF final

Kodat lost his first ITF final at an M15 event in Cairo to Juan Bautista Torres

2021: First ITF title, ATP debut, Challenger debut

Kodat began the year by capturing his first M15 ITF title in Antalya defeating Maxime Hamou. 

At the 2021 Miami Open, Kodat received a wildcard into the qualifying draw but lost to Thiago Seyboth Wild in straight sets.

In August, Kodat received a wildcard into the main draw of the Prague Challenger 50 but lost in straight sets in the first round.

2023: First Challenger Win and Top 200 Win

In February 2023, Kodat qualified for the ATP Challenger 75 in Rome in Georgia. He defeated Enzo Couacaud (190 ATP) 6-4, 6-3 in the first round of main draw. In the second round, Kodat defeated Sho Shimabukuro to reach the quarterfinals. In the quarterfinals he lost in 3 sets to Seong Chan Hong.

Junior Grand Slam finals

Singles: 1 (1 runner-up)

ATP Challenger and ITF World Tennis Tour Finals

Singles: 1 (1–1)

Doubles: 5 (3–2)

References

External links

2003 births
Living people
American male tennis players
Sportspeople from Bradenton, Florida
American people of Czech descent
Tennis people from Florida